Arksey is a village in the Metropolitan Borough of Doncaster in South Yorkshire, England. It had an estimated population of 1,303 as of 2010. It was the birthplace of the children's writer Barbara Euphan Todd on 9 January 1890. Arksey has four satellite hamlets: Shaftholme, Tilts, Almholme and Stockbridge.

The sey in Arksey means island in Old English, which is appropriate as the village is surrounded by marshland.

Arksey is older than the Domesday Book.

The Parish church of All Saints is a Grade I listed building, dating back to the 1120s.

See also
Listed buildings in Doncaster (Bentley Ward)
Arksey railway station

References

External links
 

Villages in South Yorkshire